Pedro Enrique García Aspillaga (born 7 October 1960) is a Chilean physician and politician who served as minister of Ricardo Lagos.

References

External links
 

1960 births
Living people
University of Chile alumni
Alberto Hurtado University alumni
Loyola University Maryland alumni
21st-century Chilean politicians
Christian Democratic Party (Chile) politicians